Pornography laws by region vary throughout the world. The production and distribution of pornographic films are both activities that are lawful in many, but by no means all countries so long as the pornography features performers aged above a certain age, usually eighteen years. Further restrictions are often placed on such material.

This page excludes child pornography and animal pornography. In most cases the legality of child pornography and legality of animal pornography is treated as a separate issue, and it is usually subject to its own laws.

Summary of pornography laws

Africa

Asia

Europe

North America

Oceania

South America

Africa

Botswana 
The possession of "Indecent and obscene material such as pornographic books, magazines, films, videos, DVDs and software" is prohibited in Botswana. Possession or import of such material is illegal and punishable by a fine or up to four years imprisonment.

Egypt 
In Egypt, it is illegal to distribute pornography. The possession and import of pornography are offences. Unlike numerous African nations which have no laws against child pornography, Egypt blocks child pornography websites and dealing in child pornography carries a minimum sentence of five years and fines of US$29,000.

Ethiopia 
Distributing or selling pornographic materials is illegal in Ethiopia, and their production in the country is rare. There are no official laws regarding Internet pornography in Ethiopia, making the Internet the only available source of pornography.

Morocco 
In 2004, Morocco introduced severe punishments for promoting pornography.

Nigeria 
Nigeria has no national laws prohibiting pornography, although the public display of graphic sexual material is illegal in Lagos. The country has a small indigenous pornography industry which produces exclusively heterosexual pornography as homosexual activity in Nigeria is illegal. Some Muslim politicians in the national government have proposed a nationwide block on pornographic websites. There is significant piracy of pornography in Nigeria, with pirated pornographic DVDs being sold from roadside stalls in Lagos. Pornography is also sold in Nigerian sex shops and some pornographic magazines are produced in the country, often reproducing pictures from foreign magazines.

The first officially acknowledged hardcore pornographic film produced in Nigeria was Better Lover Valentine Sex Party. It was not submitted to the National Film and Video Censors Board for classification and it was immediately banned on the grounds of obscenity and immorality. Internet pornography is widely viewed in Nigeria. In 2015 the monthly average for the number of searches for pornography was 135,000, and in December 2014 and 2015 the proportion of searches for pornography (relative to other searches) was higher in Nigeria than in the United States. In 2013 Nigeria ranked second globally for Internet searches for gay pornography.

South Africa 
Pornography rated X18 is permitted by the law only if sold to persons over the age of 18 in registered stores. It is an offense to host a pornographic web site in South Africa because of the difficulty of age-verification and the requirement that pornography only be distributed from designated, licensed physical premises. It is also unlawful to visually represent bestiality (also rated XX), but not in text descriptions. Supplying violent pornography is an offence in any form, but the law allows the production of pornography that is not prohibited.

Distribution of pornography is regulated by the Films and Publications Act of 1996, which is enforced by the Films and Publications Board.

Uganda 
Pornographic DVDs have in the past been sold on the streets in Uganda. However, an Anti-Pornography Act (popularly known as the "Anti-Miniskirt Law") was signed into law in 2014 with the stated objectives of defining what constitutes the offence of pornography and establishing a Pornography Control Committee. The committee is responsible for the implementation of the law and for taking measures to detect, prohibit, collect and destroy pornographic materials. The law broadly defines pornography as "any representation of the sexual parts of a person for primarily sexual excitement". The law says that "a person shall not produce, traffic in, publish, broadcast, procure, import, export, sell or abet any form of pornography". Breaches of the law are punishable with up to ten years in jail.

Prior to the passing of the act there were a number of laws concerning aspects of pornography in Uganda, but this was the first law to create a specific offence of pornography. The law repeals and replaces Section 166 of the Penal Code Act, widening the legal interpretation of pornography and prohibiting it comprehensively. The law has been subject to challenge in the Constitutional Court on the basis of its vague wording and the broad powers of the committee.

In July 2018, the Ugandan government directed the country's ISPs to block 27 pornographic websites.

Americas

Bahamas 
The Bahamian penal code prohibits the production and distribution of obscene publications. Many types of pornography are prohibited in the Bahamas; however, law enforcement is relaxed and does not usually enforce the prohibition. Pornography is available on Bahamian cable television and in 2014 ZNS-TV broadcast a report on the establishment of a local pornography industry in the Bahamas.

Brazil 

In Brazil, pornographic film actors must be 18 or older. Pornography which does not involve bestiality is legal when sold in public places. Depiction of sex with animals is legal. However, magazine and DVD covers that depict genitalia must not be visible from public view, and pornography can only be sold to people 18 or older.

Canada 

The laws of Canada permit the sale of hardcore pornography to anyone over the age of 18. While persons below that age may have pornography in their possession, its sale to them is prohibited. Most hardcore pornography is sold in adult stores or on adult websites.

Cuba 
Pornography was illegal in Cuba during Fidel Castro's leadership of the country, but the laws were relaxed in the 2010s. Currently, Cuba restricts online pornography.

United States 

In the United States, pornography is not unlawful at the federal level, but is subject to the Miller test, which was developed in the 1973 case Miller v. California. The Miller test was an effort to differentiate between pornography and 'obscenity'. It has three parts:
 Whether "the average person, applying contemporary community standards", would find that the work, taken as a whole, appeals to the prurient interest,
 Whether the work depicts or describes, in a patently offensive way, sexual conduct specifically defined by applicable state law,
 Whether the work, taken as a whole, lacks serious literary, artistic, political, or scientific value.

The work is considered obscene only if all three conditions are satisfied. Local areas are permitted to develop their own laws on the issue, as long as they do not conflict with federal law.

Asia

Bangladesh 

By passing the "Pornography Control Act, 2012", the government of Bangladesh prohibited the carrying, exchanging, using, selling, marketing, distributing, preserving, filming etc. of pornography (sexually explicit materials, unless it has artistic and/or educational value). Penalties include a maximum of 10 years in prison and fines up to Tk500,000 (US$6,410).

China 

It is illegal to sell, distribute pornography or arrange for pornographic performances in mainland China, but it is not illegal to own or to watch it. Pornographic material in mainland China comes from outside mainland China, or was downloaded from the Internet.

Hong Kong 
Pornographic films in Hong Kong are referred to as Category III films, after the territory's motion picture rating system. Category III films would generally be considered softcore by American and Japanese standards, often featuring more elaborate and comical plots than foreign equivalents. In the early 21st century many of the roles involving sex scenes are actually performed by Japanese actresses, with any dialogue dubbed into Cantonese, rather than by local actresses.

Hardcore pornographic videos and films, in both physical and digital forms, cannot be legally sold in the territory.

India 

 The selling and distribution of pornographic material is illegal in India under section 292
 The distribution, sale, or circulation of obscene materials and the selling of pornographic content to any person under age 20 years are illegal under section 293 and IT Act-67B.
 Child pornography is illegal and strictly prohibited across the country under section 67B of the Information Technology Act, 2000
 The manufacturing, publishing and distribution of pornography is illegal in India under section 292, 293.

In July 2015 the Supreme Court of India refused to allow the blocking of pornographic websites and said that watching pornography indoors in the privacy of one's own home was not a crime. In August 2015 the Government of India issued an order to Indian ISPs to block at least 857 websites that it considered to be pornographic. In 2015 the Department of Telecommunications (DoT) had asked internet service providers to take down 857 websites in a bid to control cyber crime, but after receiving criticism from the authorities it partially rescinded the ban. The ban from the government came after a lawyer filed a petition in the Supreme Court arguing that online pornography  encourages sex crimes and rapes.

In October 2018 the government directed Internet service providers to block 827 websites that host pornographic content following an order by the Uttarakhand High Court. The court cited the rape of a 10th standard girl from Dehradun by four of her seniors. The four accused told police that they raped the girl after watching pornography on the Internet.

Indonesia 
A law passed in 2010 states any “pictures, sketches, photos, writing, voice, sound, moving picture, animation, cartoons, conversation, gestures, or other communications shown in public with salacious content or sexual exploitation that violate the moral values of society” will have offenders face up to a 15 year jail sentence. With the maximum penalty for downloading pornographic material is a 4 year jail sentence or a 2 billion rupiah ($219,200) fine.

Japan 

Pornography is legal in Japan; however, there are restrictions. Genitalia must be pixelated or censored and all participants must be 18 years of age or older.

Malaysia 
Pornography is illegal in Malaysia with fines of up to RM10,000 for owning or sharing pornographic materials. The Malaysian Communications and Multimedia Commission (MCMC) has blocked more than 2,400 pornographic websites between 2018 and 2020.

Nepal 
Nepali law identifies pornography as illegal. The sharing, distribution and broadcasting of pornographic content through any medium is prohibited. In 2010 it was reported that the Home Ministry had banned access to a list of websites including explicitly adult websites. In September 2018, concerns about violence against women led the Government of Nepal to announce its intention to ban online pornography. From 24 September, the Nepal Telecommunications Authority (NTA) began to put a block on all websites providing pornographic content on the orders of the Nepal Government Ministry of Communication and Information Technology (MOCIT). By 12 October more than 21,000 pornographic websites had been blocked.

North Korea 

Both domestic and imported works of pornography have been available in North Korea since recent decades. Producing, distributing, importing and watching pornography is prohibited.

Possession of pornography became widespread among elites during the late 1990s. Political and army elites are the most active consumers of pornography. Locally produced pornography initially appeared during the reign of Kim Jong-il. A typical North Korean-made pornographic film involves nude or scantily clad women dancing with music.

Importing pornography to North Korea is harshly punished. Pornography is sold openly on the China–North Korea border regardless of regulations. Despite attempts to curtail circulation of imported pornography, most of the pornography watched in North Korea is currently made abroad. A significant part of pornographic media in circulation consists of Chinese bootleg recordings of poor quality.

There is no access to foreign pornographic websites from within North Korea.

Pakistan 

Pornography in Pakistan is illegal and is subject to several legal provisions. Since November 2011 the Government has placed a complete ban on Internet websites containing pornographic material. The list of banned websites is updated on an ongoing basis.  Despite this, child pornography is illegal and strictly forbidden in Pakistan and there are severe punishments for possessing or viewing child pornography which include a minimum of 14 years to 20 years in prison and a fine of 1 million Rupees. Pakistan also has cyber unit to curb child pornography within the country. The unit has a team of 40 members and one director-level official, who independently investigate the issue. The unit is integrated with the National Database and Registration Authority (NADRA) and Pakistan Telecommunication Authority (PTA).

Philippines 

The Philippine penal code prohibits the production and distribution of obscene publications. Despite this, enforcement is lax. Some local productions of pornography are known to exist in the country.

As of January 14, 2017, several pornography sites, mostly mainstream ones such as Pornhub and XVideos, have been blocked in the Philippines as part of a government crackdown on child pornography. The Philippine government cites Republic Act 9775 or the Anti-Child Pornography Law as legal justification for the blocks. The list of sites blocked vary depending on the internet service provider enforcing them.

Saudi Arabia 
Items considered pornographic by Saudi Arabian standards are forbidden in the country. Customs authorities enforce strict regulations concerning the importation of pornographic items into Saudi Arabia. Such items may be confiscated on arrival and the owner may be subject to a fine.

South Korea 

Pornography is banned by the government in South Korea, with laws strictly enforced. The distribution, sale or display of obscene materials via the Internet can be punished with up to one year's imprisonment, although there is no penalty for watching or possessing Internet pornography; the exception is child pornography, the possession of which carries a maximum one-year prison sentence, and the maximum sentence for distributing, selling or displaying it for commercial purposes is ten years.

Many foreign pornographic websites are blocked, and those found to be operating from within the country are shut down. The Korea Internet Safety Commission is responsible for instructing Internet service providers to block access to "pornography and nudity". Google Search in South Korea filters search results for around 700 terms considered by the government to be adult in nature unless the user demonstrates that they are aged over 19.

Sri Lanka 

The laws against pornography in Sri Lanka are strict. Under the Explicit Literature Ordinance, sale or possession of pornographic material can be classified as illegal. The production of local pornography is strictly illegal.

Child pornography is considered to be illegal under the National Child Protection act and the punishments are very severe. Child pornography possession, production and distribution is punishable by up to 20 years' imprisonment, severe fines and in some cases, even forfeiture of property. This act covers the rights of children, but not pornography per se. Therefore, the same act cannot be used as an anti-pornographic law.

In the year of 2009, the government banned more than 100 local and international porn sites and nearly 80 Sri Lankan porn stars were arrested by the local authorities. They were all sentenced to fines, community service and prison sentences up to two years.

Syria 
Pornography is banned in the country. The government has blocked access to around 160 websites.

Thailand 
Possession, production and distribution of pornography for the purposes of trade is illegal in Thailand under section 287 of the Thai Penal Code. The same section also criminalizes participating or assisting in the trade of pornography. A person guilty under this section can be punished with imprisonment not exceeding three years or fined not exceeding THB6,000 or both.

Despite this pornography is widely available in Thailand and the law remains usually unenforced with the exception of some high-profile cases. On November 3, 2020, The Ministry of Digital Economy and Society announced that it has banned Pornhub, along with 190 other pornographic websites. The ministry stated that the ban was part of the efforts to restrict access to porn and gambling websites, which remains illegal in Thailand.

Turkmenistan 
A law passed on 1 January 2015 bans access to internet pornography in Turkmenistan.

Vietnam 
Production, distribution, broadcasting, transport, import and advertisement of pornography, is strictly illegal in Vietnam. In 1996 officials became concerned about pornographic films in the country and launched a campaign, with courts awarding fines and prison sentences. Pornography in Vietnam is classed as a "social evil".

Europe

Belarus 
Production, dissemination and assembly of pornography is banned, with laws strictly enforced. Breaking the law is punishable with up to four years in prison.

France 
In France, pornography is overall permitted, but with distinctions:
 Hardcore pornography must not be sold to minors under the age of 18.
 Softcore porn is allowed for people 16 and over.
 Extremely violent or graphic pornography is considered X-rated, and so may be shown only in specific theaters, and may not be displayed to minors.
 Some pornography has a special VAT (value-added tax): a 33% tax is levied on X-rated movies, and a 50% excise is placed on pornographic online services.

The ratings system has caused controversy. For example, in 2000 the sexually explicit and violent film Baise-moi was initially rated only as "restricted" by the French government. This classification was overturned by a Conseil d'État ruling in a lawsuit brought by associations supporting Christian and family values.

Some movies are forbidden to minors under 18, without the X rating, like Baise-moi, Ken Park or Saw 3, so that these movies can be viewed in theaters and not attract VAT.

Germany 
The constitution and law are very strict about hardcore pornography, especially when compared to very liberal laws about softcore pornography, prostitution and sex shops. Supplying hardcore pornography to people who are less than 18 years old is an offence, and shops selling it must keep people under the age of 18 from entering their premises. If only a part of the shop is dedicated to pornography, it must be completely closed off from the rest of the premises. Alternatively, shops may choose not to display their goods or advertise that they sell them, in which case minors may be admitted. Websites hosting pornographic material within Germany must comply with very strict rules about verifying that viewers are over 18. 

Soft porn is less restricted, and may even be broadcast on TV at night. The age threshold is usually FSK-16. In contrast many uncut action films or video games easily reach the FSK-18 rating.

Hungary 
Hungary's parliament passed a law that bans pornography to anyone under 18 years old.

Iceland 
The production or sale of pornography is prohibited in Iceland. Heavy fines were applied in 2001 and ten years earlier a fine was applied to the first manager of the first private TV station (and the only case to present) in Iceland for showing the Danish "mainstream" Zodiac-films, I Tvillingernes tegn and I Tyrens tegn. In early 2013 there was a draft proposal by Ögmundur Jónasson, the Minister of the Interior, to extend the ban to online pornography to protect children from violent sexual imagery. The plan has been stalled since the change in government during the parliamentary election on 27 April 2013. Since then, there have been no changes to the relevant legislation, and no changes have been formally proposed.

Italy 

In Italy, it is illegal to distribute pictorial or video pornography to persons under the age of 18. However, persons over 18 years of age are permitted to view pornographic material.

Netherlands 

Pornography is currently legal in the country.

Russia 
According to Russian law, consumption of pornography is allowed though the production of it is not. The illegal production, distribution, and "public demonstration" of pornography is punishable by a 2- to 6-year prison term. Roskomnadzor, the Russian government's media overseer, has the power to order the blocking of pornographic websites. In 2015 the agency required the blocking of the Russian-language version of Pornhub and 10 other pornographic sites on the basis of a court ruling.

There is nevertheless some uncertainty concerning the legal status of pornography in Russia. The law criminalizes only the 'illegal' production and selling of pornography (which implies that it sometimes can be legal), but two circumstances make enforcement of the law difficult: (1) the lack of a legal definition of pornography, and (2) no law defining when production or selling is permitted.

Ukraine 
Pornographic production, distribution, broadcasting (both audio and video), transportation, import and advertisement is forbidden by law in Ukraine.

United Kingdom 

In England and Wales, the main legislation on pornographic materials is the Obscene Publications Act 1959, the Obscene Publications Act 1964, and the Indecent Displays (Control) Act 1981. Video-oriented depictions of hardcore material (with certain exceptions for works considered primarily 'artistic' rather than pornographic) were banned until 1999, when the removal of trade barriers with other European Union member states allowed for the relatively free movement of such goods for personal use. R18-rated videos are only available in licensed sex shops, but hardcore pornographic magazines are available in shops selling newspapers and magazines.

In 2008, the Crown Prosecution Service unsuccessfully prosecuted a man under the Obscene Publications Act (the R v Walker trial) for a textual story on a pornography website involving Girls Aloud. Also that year, the Home Office introduced legislation to criminalize possession of what it has labelled extreme pornography; these laws are now contained in sections 63 to 68 of the Criminal Justice and Immigration Act 2008.

Oceania

American Samoa 
Pornography is illegal in American Samoa and is punishable by a fine of up to $USD5,000.

Australia 

In Australia, it is legal to possess pornographic material, except child pornography. However, it is illegal to sell, exhibit or rent X-rated pornographic material in all states (Victoria, South Australia, Western Australia, New South Wales, Tasmania, and Queensland) but it is legal to do so in the two territories (the Northern Territory and the Australian Capital Territory). As the Australian constitution prohibits states from regulating interstate commerce, it is permitted to purchase pornography in either territory and then bring it interstate. As a result, the majority of Australian mail-order operations for adult material operate from the ACT.

In 2007, the Northern Territory National Emergency Response introduced by the Howard Government made the possession of RC and X18+ pornography an offence in some Aboriginal communities.

Fiji 
Pornography featuring consenting adults is legal in Fiji.

Nauru 
Pornography, including online pornography, is illegal in Nauru and pornographic websites are blocked.

New Zealand 
In New Zealand, pornography is generally treated in a liberal manner and very little is banned by the Office of Film and Literature Classification. However, the most extreme forms of pornography (such as child pornography, rape, necrophilia, bestiality, urophilia and coprophilia) are classified as objectionable material by the Office of Film and Literature Classification, effectively banning them. Indecency laws still criminalise some acts under the Crimes Act 1961. Pornographic DVDs and magazines that arrive in New Zealand need to be examined by either New Zealand Customs, Department of Internal Affairs, New Zealand Police or the Office of Film and Literature Classification before being given an R18 classification. Internet pornography is also regulated but only if websites are based in New Zealand, in which case they will need consent from Department of Internal Affairs. Possession of any material that has objectionable content (which is illegal in New Zealand) is punishable by up to 10 years in jail and a $50,000 fine, or 14 years in jail for distribution of same.

Papua New Guinea 
In Papua New Guinea, the possession, import, export, and sale of pornography are all offenses. Control is strict. According to the government, all websites containing pornography, nudity or depictions of sex are blocked and the government has been blocking such sites since early 2009. Under the law, persons who possess, own, import, export, sell or exhibit pornography to the public are subject to arrest and trial and can face up to six months' imprisonment and/or a fine up to 50,000 to 100,000 Papua New Guinean kina. In PNG, pornography is subject to legal restraints to publication on grounds of obscenity. Laws relating to pornography in Papua New Guinea are vague. The main legislation used in dealing with cases relating to pornographic nature refer back to the Chapter 262 Criminal Code of Papua New Guinea, Lukautim Pikinini Act 2009, Classification of Publication Censorship Act 1989 and the National ICT Act, 2009. Improper Use of ICT Services.

Samoa 
In 2021, a court ruled that online pornography should be blocked by Samoa's two major service providers, Digicel and Vodafone.

Tonga 
Under the Pornography Control Act 2002, pornography is illegal and punishable by a fine of up to $10,000, three years in prison or both.

Vanuatu 
Production of pornography is illegal in Vanuatu.

See also 

 Legality of child pornography

Notes

References 

 
Law by region
Law-related lists
Age and society
Ageism
Minimum ages
Sex laws
Sexuality and age
Youth rights